Loculus may refer to:

Loculus (satchel)
Loculus (architecture), a burial niche
An alternative name for a locule, or compartment in an organism.
Loculus of Archimedes or Ostomachion, a mathematical puzzle similar to tangrams